Calle Olof Sigvard Örnemark (19 December 1933 – 4 August 2015) was a Swedish artist and sculptor from Jönköping Municipality, Sweden. He is particularly known for his large wooden sculptures, but he also made paintings and metal sculptures.

According to the legend, the giant was on the way home from a party in Västergötland. He threw some grass and soil into lake Vättern for his wife to step on, thus creating the island Visingsö.

In the 1980s his very large outdoor wooden sculptures Bounty and Indiska reptricket (the Indian rope trick) at Riddersberg manor, south of Jönköping drew many visitors. The mobile Bounty resembled a ship and the 103 meter high Indiska reptricket was the world's highest sculpture. Both were torn down in 2007 after their condition had deteriorated.

His later work includes a wooden balloon in Gränna, Sweden and Morgans skip in Gratangen, Norway, showing the wrecking of 
Henry Morgan's ship Oxford in the Caribbean.

Örnemark lived and worked in Gränna, but also maintained a studio on Visingsö.

Örnemark died on 4 August 2015 at the age of 81.

References

Further reading

External links 
 Calle Örnemark website 

1933 births
2015 deaths
Swedish male sculptors
20th-century Swedish painters
Swedish male painters
21st-century Swedish painters
Swedish woodcarvers
20th-century sculptors
20th-century Swedish male artists
21st-century Swedish male artists